The Manchester, Bolton and Bury Canal Act 1791  (31 Geo. III) c.68 was an Act of the Parliament of Great Britain that granted permission for the construction of the Manchester Bolton & Bury Canal in Greater Manchester, England.

Entitled "An Act for making and maintaining a navigable Canal from Manchester to or near Presto-lee-Bridge, in the township of Little Lever, and from thence by one branch to or near the town of Bolton, and by another branch to or near the town of Bury, and to Weddell Brook in the parish of Bury, all in the county palatine of Lancaster.", it empowered the proprietors to raise shares of £100 each, totalling £47,000, to set tonnage rates, and allowed nearby mines and businesses to make connections to the canal.

References

Bibliography

Great Britain Acts of Parliament 1791
1791 in England